The Texas Combat Service Ribbon is the eighth highest campaign/service award that may be issued to a service member of the Texas Military Forces. Subsequent awards are denoted by a bronze star device.

Eligibility
The Texas Combat Service Ribbon is awarded to any service member of the Texas Military Forces who:

 After 11 September 2001
 Is deployed outside the United States
 For a period of not less than 30 days
 Serving or flying into a hostile fire zone
 In support of Operation Iraqi Freedom, Operation Enduring Freedom, and any future combat operations

Authority
The Texas Combat Service Ribbon was established by Senator Kel Seliger in Senate Bill 955, authorized by the Seventy-ninth Texas Legislature, and approved by Governor Rick Perry on 17 June 2005, effective the same date.

Description

Ribbon 
The ribbon is 1-3/8 inches wide and is composed of stripes of red (15/32 of an inch), white (3/16 of an inch), red (1/8 of an inch), white (1/8 of an inch), blue (1/8 of an inch), white (3/16 of an inch), and blue (15/32 of an inch).

Device 
A five-pointed bronze star, 3/16 of an inch in circumscribing diameter, is issued to be worn to denote second and succeeding awards of the Texas Combat Service Ribbon. Stars will be worn centered on the service ribbon, with one point up. A maximum of four stars will be worn.

Notable Recipients

See also 

 Awards and decorations of the Texas Military
 Awards and decorations of the Texas government
 Texas Military Forces
 Texas Military Department
 List of conflicts involving the Texas Military

References

Texas
Texas Military Forces
Texas Military Department